Chase Lake is a lake that is located north of Pinnacle, New York. Fish species present in the lake are pickerel, white sucker, yellow perch, pumpkinseed sunfish, and brown bullhead. There is access by trail from Pinnacle Road on the southwest shore.

References

Lakes of New York (state)
Lakes of Fulton County, New York